Dorrance Kirtland (July 28, 1770 – May 23, 1840) was a U.S. Representative from New York.

Born in Coxsackie, New York, Kirtland graduated from Yale College in 1789, studied law, was admitted to the bar, and commenced practice in Coxsackie.

From 1808 to 1838 Kirtland was Surrogate Judge of Greene County.  In 1830 he published a book on surrogate court laws and procedure, A Treatise on the Practice in Surrogates' Courts in the State of New York.

Kirtland was elected as a Democratic-Republican to the Fifteenth Congress (March 4, 1817 – March 3, 1819).

He served as Judge of Greene County's Court of Common Pleas from 1828 to 1838.

Kirtland died in Coxsackie on May 23, 1840, and was interred in Old Coxsackie Cemetery.

Sources

1770 births
1840 deaths
Yale College alumni
New York (state) lawyers
New York (state) state court judges
People from Coxsackie, New York
Democratic-Republican Party members of the United States House of Representatives from New York (state)
Burials in New York (state)
19th-century American lawyers